ALSA or alsa can refer to:

 Advanced Linux Sound Architecture, a Linux kernel component
 Air Land Sea Application Center, an organization of the United States Department of Defense responsible for developing tactics and procedures
 Airline Stewardess Association, a trade union
 ALS Association, an American non-profit organization dealing with amyotrophic lateral sclerosis (ALS) or  Lou Gehrig's disease
 ALSA (bus company), a bus company based in Spain
 Australian Law Students' Association, an Australian law student organisation
 An alternative name for harees, a Mappila dish in Kerala, south India
 , a brand of baking and dessert mixes in France 

es:ALSA